Israel Cohen is a former Israeli footballer, who in 2002 (while playing for Hapoel Haifa) was suspected of match fixing.

Cohen currently plays amateur basketball with Hapoel Modi'in in Liga Bet (the 5th tier).

Honours
Israeli Premier League (1):
1999-00
Israel State Cup (1):
2000
Liga Gimel (Center) (2):
2004-05, 2007–08
Liga Bet (South) (1):
2005-06
Liga Alef (South) (1):
2006-07

References

1971 births
Living people
Israeli Jews
Israeli footballers
Hapoel Ramat Gan F.C. players
Hapoel Petah Tikva F.C. players
Maccabi Herzliya F.C. players
Hapoel Tel Aviv F.C. players
Beitar Jerusalem F.C. players
Hapoel Haifa F.C. players
Maccabi Kafr Kanna F.C. players
Hapoel Rishon LeZion F.C. players
Hapoel F.C. Ortodoxim Lod players
Hapoel Maxim Lod F.C. players
Liga Leumit players
Israeli Premier League players
Association football defenders
Footballers from Lod